WNYB (channel 26) is a television station licensed to Jamestown, New York, United States, serving the Buffalo area as an owned-and-operated station of Tri-State Christian Television (TCT). Its transmitter is located on Center Road in Arkwright. WNYB maintained studios on Big Tree Road in Orchard Park until TCT ended local operations in June 2018.

WNYB operates two low-power translators: WBNF-CD (channel 15) in Buffalo and WNIB-LD (channel 42) in Rochester.

History

CTV invades America
The Channel 26 license was first granted to WNYP-TV in 1966. The station's majority shareholder was Lowell W. "Bud" Paxson, who at the time owned Jamestown's WXYJ radio and later co-founded the Home Shopping Network (HSN). It was the first American television station to affiliate with a Canadian network, signing a deal with CTV. Since the station could not afford a direct feed, station engineers switched to and from the signal of CTV's flagship CFTO-TV (channel 9) in Toronto whenever network programming was airing. WNYP was Paxson's first venture into television.

WNYP quickly became notorious, almost legendary among Western New York's broadcast community for gaffes and programming mishaps. For instance, the station showed the same episode of The Aquanauts several times, every day at the same time, over a two-week period. Also, the equipment used to pick up the off-air signal from CFTO would sometimes relay the video from another station broadcasting on VHF channel 9 instead (such as ABC affiliate WNYS-TV in Syracuse or CBS affiliate WWTV in Cadillac, Michigan) due to tropospheric propagation overwhelming CFTO's signal. Often, when CFTO programming actually was being rebroadcast, the station switcher failed to drop CFTO's identification to display the WNYP-TV callsign, which was considered a violation of Federal Communications Commission (FCC) rules. Inexplicably, the audio line from a Jamestown radio station could sometimes be heard in the background when CTV programming was airing. Paxson also earned significant animus for airing programming from CHCH-TV (channel 11) and CBC Television's CBLT (channel 5) without permission; although it had been legal to broadcast foreign programming in the United States without permission as a result of laws passed during World War II, the programs' copyright owners took legal action against WNYP.

Since CTV, then as now, relies largely on American programming, Buffalo's "Big 3" U.S. network affiliates—WBEN-TV (channel 4, now WIVB-TV); WGR-TV (channel 2, now WGRZ-TV); and WKBW-TV (channel 7)—threatened legal action in early 1969. Faced with the loss of its primary source of programming, WNYP cut back its local newscasts, laid off staff, and briefly attempted to use a prototype of what would become HSN's on-air product sales strategy to stay afloat. It briefly started to identify as WJTV, but quickly reverted to WNYP-TV because a station in Jackson, Mississippi already had those call letters. The death knell for the station sounded with the announcement that WUTV would sign on from Buffalo in 1970. Buffalo was not big enough at the time to support two independent stations, so Paxson opted to take the station off the air. (Paxson later started the Pax TV network, now known as Ion, and owns WPXJ-TV (channel 51) in the market; coincidentally, Pax/Ion has also imported much of its programming from CTV over the course of its history).

Later incarnations
After going dark, the station's equipment was sold to Elmira ABC affiliate WENY-TV (channel 36), who used much of it to aid in its launch. The channel 26 allocation was used for much of the 1970s and 1980s by a low-power experimental Appalachian Television Service "translator" relay station (W26AA) of WNED-TV from Buffalo, operated by the regional Board of Cooperative Educational Services, which was able to originate local programming from studios in Fredonia. Channel 26 is the last remaining survivor of WNED-TV's once massive translator network that had several repeaters scattered throughout the Southern Tier of Western New York; all of the others were shut down by 2012.

The license was re-issued to a new group years later, and channel 26 signed on again on September 24, 1988, under the new call letters WTJA. Part of the station's programming lineup duplicated those on the Buffalo stations. Much of the programming consisted of public domain material, and the station was virtually ignored by local advertisers. Buffalo-area cable providers refused to carry the station because its signal was barely acceptable even under the best conditions: the "Grade B" signal coverage barely reached the southern Buffalo suburbs, and the station once again went dark in 1991.

TCT arrives
Grant Broadcasting purchased the license in 1995. Rather than immediately putting the station back on the air, Grant negotiated with Marion, Illinois–based Tri-State Christian Television, owner of WNYB (channel 49), for the channel 49 license, in exchange for the channel 26 license, cash and a new broadcasting facility. With a new, more powerful transmitter and a tall transmission tower in one of the highest hills of western New York State, channel 26 would change from having a very poor signal to one of the largest coverage areas in the Northeastern U.S., viewable from Erie, Pennsylvania to the southwest suburbs of Toronto. Tri-State accepted and on January 10, 1997, it took over the channel 26 license, moving its religious programming and the WNYB call letters to the new channel (Grant in turn took over channel 49, which became WB affiliate WNYO-TV; it became a MyNetworkTV affiliate in 2006 when The WB merged with UPN to form CW).

End of local operations
In June 2018, after more than 21 years, TCT announced it had ceased local programming and was placing its former studios on Big Tree Road in Orchard Park up for sale. The change came with the elimination of the FCC's Main Studio Rule earlier in the year and a decision by TCT to consolidate all programming operations at the network's headquarters in Marion, Illinois.

Technical information

Subchannels
The station's digital signal is multiplexed:

Analog-to-digital conversion
WNYB discontinued regular programming on its analog signal, over UHF channel 26, in early May 2009. The station's digital signal relocated from its pre-transition UHF channel 27 to channel 26. The station switched to low VHF channel 5 on August 2, 2019, as part of the FCC's spectrum incentive auction.

Translators

References

External links

Jamestown, New York
Television channels and stations established in 1967
1967 establishments in New York (state)
NYB
National Hockey League over-the-air television broadcasters
Tri-State Christian Television affiliates
TheGrio affiliates